The Lutheran Free Church (LFC) was a Lutheran denomination that existed in the United States, mainly in Minnesota and North Dakota, from 1897 until its merger into the American Lutheran Church (ALC) in 1963. The history of the church body predates its official organization, and a group of congregations that did not join the ALC formed the Association of Free Lutheran Congregations.

Background

Georg Sverdrup and Sven Oftedal were two scholars from prominent Haugean families in Norway who came to Augsburg Seminary, now Augsburg University, in Minneapolis, Minnesota, to teach in the 1870s, bringing with them a radical view of Christian education that was centered on Scripture and the simple doctrines of Christianity. The Haugean movement took its name from Norwegian lay evangelist Hans Nielsen Hauge who spoke up against the Church establishment in Norway. Sverdrup and  Oftedal had been concerned about hierarchy within the Christian church as well as the study of the Bible. They believed that, according to the New Testament, the local congregation was the correct form of God's kingdom on earth. Their vision was for a church that promoted a “living” Christianity, emphasized an evangelism that would result in changed lives, and enabled the church member to exercise his/her spiritual gifts.

Augsburg was the seminary of the Conference of the Norwegian-Danish Evangelical Lutheran Church of America In 1890, the "Conference" joined with two other Lutheran church bodies to form the United Norwegian Lutheran Church of America (UNLC).

A dispute within the UNLC over which school, Augsburg or St. Olaf, should be the college of the church body led in 1893 to the creation of the Friends of Augsburg. By 1896, Sverdrup, Oftedal, and others felt their beliefs of a "free church in a free land" were being compromised and broke away from the UNLC, forming the Lutheran Free Church in 1897.

The LFC's publishing house was the Messenger Press and its official English language magazine was the Lutheran Messenger started in 1918. During most of its earlier history the church also published a Norwegian language publication named Folkebladet  (the People's Paper).

In harmony with its emphasis on utilizing and developing the natural spiritual gifts of all the members of the Church, the LFC gave a freer rein to women within its church body to hold non-ordained ministries, offices, and responsibilities than many of its contemporary Lutheran counterparts.  The LFC also strongly emphasized the importance of foreign missions (with missions fields in Madagascar and the Cameroons) and spent more of its financial resources on foreign missions and supported a larger number of foreign missionaries than many of its contemporary Lutheran church bodies of comparable size.

By the 1950s there was a growing movement by many Lutherans throughout the United States to merge smaller Lutheran bodies into larger ones. The Lutheran Free Church joined the American Lutheran Church on February 1, 1963, after votes were held in 1955, 1957, and 1961. In 1988 the ALC itself joined with other Lutheran churches to form the Evangelical Lutheran Church in America (ELCA). About 40 Lutheran Free Churches however did not join the ALC, instead forming the Association of Free Lutheran Congregations (AFLC) in October 1962. Today the AFLC has more than 250 congregations.

In 1963, just before its merger into the ALC, the LFC had 252 pastors, 334 congregations, and 90,253 members.

Presidents of the LFC
Term of office: one year 1897-1920. Three years 1920-1963

Annual Conferences

1897 Minneapolis, Minnesota
1898 Minneapolis, Minnesota
1899 Dalton, Minnesota
1900 Montevideo, Minnesota
1901 Willmar, Minnesota
1902 Audubon, Minnesota
1903 Minneapolis, Minnesota
1904 Minneapolis, Minnesota
1905 Willmar, Minnesota
1906 Battle Lake, Minnesota
1907 Fargo, North Dakota
1908 Minneapolis, Minnesota
1909 Montevideo, Minnesota
1910 Valley City, North Dakota
1911 Willmar, Minnesota
1912 Thief River Falls, Minnesota
1913 Minneapolis, Minnesota
1914 Brainerd, Minnesota
1915 Marinette, Wisconsin
1916 Willmar, Minnesota
1917 Fargo, North Dakota
1918 Minneapolis, Minnesota
1919 Minneapolis, Minnesota
1920 Thief River Falls, Minnesota
1921 Minneapolis, Minnesota
1922 Fargo, North Dakota
1923 Minneapolis, Minnesota
1924 Northfield, Minnesota
1925 Minneapolis, Minnesota
1926 Willmar, Minnesota
1927 Fargo, North Dakota
1928 Minneapolis, Minnesota
1929 Thief River Falls, Minnesota

1930 Fergus Falls, Minnesota
1931 Fargo, North Dakota
1932 Minneapolis, Minnesota
1933 Willmar, Minnesota
1934 Duluth, Minnesota
1935 Minneapolis, Minnesota
1936 Fargo, North Dakota
1937 Minneapolis, Minnesota
1938 Thief River Falls, Minnesota
1939 Minneapolis, Minnesota
1940 La Crosse, Wisconsin
1941 Morris, Minnesota
1942 Fargo, North Dakota
1943 Minneapolis, Minnesota
1944 Willmar, Minnesota
1945 Minneapolis, Minnesota
1946 Fargo, North Dakota
1947 Minneapolis, Minnesota
1948 Willmar, Minnesota
1949 Morris, Minnesota
1950 Minneapolis, Minnesota
1951 Seattle, Washington
1952 Fargo, North Dakota
1953 Minneapolis, Minnesota
1954 Thief River Falls, Minnesota
1955 Minneapolis, Minnesota
1956 Fargo, North Dakota
1957 Minneapolis, Minnesota
1958 Minneapolis, Minnesota
1959 Minot, North Dakota
1960 Fargo, North Dakota
1961 Minneapolis, Minnesota
1962 Minneapolis, Minnesota

References

Other sources

Clarence J. Carlsen, The Years of Our Church (Minneapolis, MN: The Lutheran Free Church Publishing Company, 1942) 
Eugene L. Fevold, The Lutheran Free Church: A Fellowship of American Lutheran Congregations 1897-1963 (Minneapolis, MN: Augsburg Publishing House, 1969)
Aarflot, Andreas  Hans Nielsen Hauge, his life and message (Augsburg Publishing House, Minneapolis, MN. 1979)
Hamre, James S. Georg Sverdrup: Educator, Theologian, Churchman (Northfield, MN: Norwegian-American Historical Association. 1986)
Loiell Dyrud, The Quest for Freedom: The Lutheran Free Church to The Association of Free Lutheran Congregations (Minneapolis, MN: Ambassador Publications, 2000)
Augsburg College- The Lutheran Free Church. CLiC Digital Collections.

Lutheran denominations in North America
Evangelical Lutheran Church in America predecessor churches
History of Christianity in the United States
Religious organizations established in 1897
Lutheranism in Minnesota
Lutheranism in North Dakota